Bathurst County was one of the original Nineteen Counties in New South Wales and is now one of the 141 Cadastral divisions of New South Wales. It includes the area to the south-west of Bathurst to Cowra and Orange. The Lachlan River is the boundary to the south-west, the Belubula River forms part of the northern boundary, with the Fish River on the northeastern boundary. Blayney is located roughly in the middle.

Bathurst County was named in honour of Henry Bathurst, 3rd Earl 1762–1834. The Electoral district of Bathurst (County) was the first state electoral district for the area, between 1856 and 1859.

At this time it was described as having some of the best wool in the colony, with excellent farming land.

Parishes within this county
A full list of parishes found within this county; their current LGA and mapping coordinates to the approximate centre of each location is as follows:

References

 Counties of New South Wales